The 2015 Tajik Football Super Cup was the 6th Tajik Supercup match, a football match which was contested between the 2014 Tajik League and Cup champions, Istiklol, and the Tajik League Runners-up, Khayr Vahdat.

Match details

See also
2015 Tajik League
2015 Tajik Cup

References

Super Cup
Tajik Supercup